"As Long As I’m Sure of You" is a song written by Dyer Hurdon and Basil Hurdon, and recorded by Bobby Curtola in 1964. The song was a Canadian Top 40 hit, peaking at number 11 in 1964.

References

1964 songs
1964 singles